Séamus Coleman (born 11 October 1988) is an Irish professional footballer who plays as a right-back and captains both Premier League club Everton and the Republic of Ireland national team.

Originally a Gaelic footballer, Coleman started his association football career with St Catherine's in Killybegs. He joined League of Ireland side Sligo Rovers in 2006 after impressing in a friendly against them. He then made the move to England to sign for Everton in January 2009 for a £60,000 fee. In 2010, he spent half a season on loan with Blackpool, helping them win promotion via the Championship play-offs, before returning to Everton where he has made over 400 appearances.

Coleman has been a senior international for the Republic of Ireland since 2011, acquiring over 50 caps. He won the 2011 Nations Cup and was awarded the FAI Under-21 International Player of the Year in both 2009 and 2010. He was selected for the Ireland squad at UEFA Euro 2016, captaining Ireland against both Italy and France. He was named the new Ireland captain in September 2016 following Robbie Keane's international retirement.

Early life
Coleman was raised in Killybegs, a fishing port in County Donegal in the west of Ulster, the northern province of Ireland. Two of his uncles played Gaelic football. His maternal aunt Anne (née Carr) came from Crove, a townland between Glengesh and Meenaneary, and is the mother of Dessie Farrell.

Coleman has two brothers: Francis and Stephen (known as Stevie). His parents are Henry and Máire Coleman. Henry is from Tinahely in County Wicklow, while Máire (née Carr) is from the townland of Crove (Irish: Cróibh) near Carrick, a village to the west of Killybegs. Stevie has cerebral palsy and participated in the 2003 Special Olympics World Summer Games football event where the Irish team won bronze medals. Séamus grew up in the housing estate of Cummins Hill and attended Niall Mór National School for his primary education. He attended St Catherine's Vocational School in Killybegs for his secondary education. He did his Leaving Certificate in 2006.

Coleman himself initially played Gaelic football, and, aged 16, played as a back on his local GAA team, Na Cealla Beaga. He also played for the Donegal county team at under-16 level, winning a Buncrana Cup in 2004. Coleman was a boyhood Manchester United fan.

Club career

Sligo Rovers
Coleman was spotted by Sligo Rovers when he lined up against them in a friendly for his hometown club, St Catherine's. He made his League of Ireland debut against Derry City at the Brandywell in October 2006 as a substitute for Adam Hughes.

Sligo Rovers coach Rob McDonald did not rate Coleman very highly as a player, telling him that he should join League of Ireland First Division club Finn Harps. McDonald departed Sligo Rovers in March 2007, and was replaced by Paul Cook, of whom Coleman later said: "He made me feel like I was the best player in the League. It just makes such a difference when you have a manager who believes in you".

Coleman scored his only goal for Rovers against Bray Wanderers on 17 May 2008, concluding a 3–0 win.

Everton
Following a recommendation by Willie McStay to former teammate and Everton manager David Moyes, Coleman was signed by the Merseyside club for £60,000 in January 2009, ahead of other interest from Ipswich Town, Birmingham City and Celtic. Before playing a game for Everton, Coleman had to undergo surgery on a career-threatening infected blister. He made his debut on 22 October 2009 in the Europa League group stage in a 5–0 loss to Benfica at the Estádio da Luz, being beaten to the ball by Javier Saviola for the first goal. Three days later in his Goodison Park debut, a Premier League match against Tottenham Hotspur, Coleman was named Man of the Match after coming on as a first-half substitute for the injured Joseph Yobo, and played an instrumental part for both of Everton's goals in a 2–2 draw. He made his FA Cup debut against Carlisle United in the third round on 2 January 2010, replacing Tony Hibbert in the 80th minute and creating a goal for Tim Cahill two minutes later, in a 3–1 home win.

Loan to Blackpool
On 19 March 2010, Coleman joined Championship club Blackpool on loan, initially for one month as a replacement for the injured Neal Eardley. He made his debut the next day, in a 2–2 draw at home to Crystal Palace. He scored his first goal for the Tangerines in a 4–2 win away to Scunthorpe United on 2 April. Later that month, Coleman's loan was extended until the end of the season, while on 19 May he agreed a new four-year contract with Everton. He played in Blackpool's play–off final at Wembley Stadium, which they won 3–2 against Cardiff City.

Return from loan
Coleman returned to Everton for the following season, breaking into the first team on the right of midfield. He scored his first goal for Everton against Brentford in the League Cup third round on 21 September 2010. He opened the scoring at Griffin Park in the sixth minute, but also gave away a penalty with a foul on Myles Weston, which Ján Mucha saved from Charlie MacDonald, although Brentford eventually won in a penalty shoot-out after a 1–1 draw. He scored his first Premier League goal against his former team Blackpool on 6 November to secure a 2–2 draw at Bloomfield Road, signed a new four-and-a-half-year deal two months later, and was nominated for the 2011 PFA Young Player of the Year Award. He finished the season having scored four league goals, though was sent off in the final game of the season, a 1–0 win against Chelsea.

2012–2016

On 31 December 2012, Coleman signed a new five-and-a-half-year contract with Everton.

The 2013–14 season proved to be Coleman's best to date as he scored six league goals, more than his previous seasons at the club combined. In April, he was named in the PFA Team of the Year. He was also named Everton's Player of the Year and Players' Player of the Year. Manager Roberto Martínez hailed Coleman as one of the best full-backs in world football as he was part of a defence which conceded just 39 goals to help Everton finish fifth with a club record of 72 Premier League points. He created 45 chances during the season, the third highest amongst Everton players and had the second highest pass completion at 88%.

On 26 June 2014, Coleman signed a new five-year contract with Everton. He scored his first ever goal in European football for Everton on 18 September 2014, netting their second in a 4–1 win over Wolfsburg in the first match of their Europa League campaign. On 19 February 2015, he was again on target in Europe, in a 4–1 win over BSC Young Boys in the last 32. On 22 March, Coleman scored the first goal in an eventual 2–1 away success against Queens Park Rangers with Toffees boss Roberto Martínez praising the full-back for his performance, describing him as "magnificent in his defensive duties" and labelling his opener as "a striker's goal".

Coleman scored his only goal of the 2015–16 season in a 3–0 away victory against Stoke City on 6 February 2016.

On 17 September, he opened his 2016–17 goalscoring account in a 3–1 home win against Middlesbrough with a great solo run and finish on his weaker foot. He scored his second goal of the season on 19 November with an 89th-minute header to equalise in a 1–1 home draw against Swansea City.

2017–present
Coleman's first goal of 2017 came on 21 January as he secured all three points with an 87th-minute winner in a 1–0 triumph over Crystal Palace at Selhurst Park.

Coleman suffered a fractured tibia and fibula in his right leg following a dangerous challenge from Neil Taylor whilst on international duty with Ireland in March 2017 and was unlikely to return to action until 2018. It was announced a few days after his injury that FIFA would pay his basic salary for the duration of his rehabilitation. During his recovery, Coleman signed a new five-year contract which would keep him at the club until the summer of 2022.

He made his Everton return on 31 January 2018, in a 2–1 win over Leicester City.

Coleman became Everton club captain in August 2019, following Phil Jagielka's departure after a 12-year tenure. On 15 December that year, he made his 300th Everton appearance in a 1–1 draw at Manchester United.

On 28 July 2021, Coleman signed a contract extension to keep him at Everton until the end of June 2023.

International career

Youth
Coleman has represented Ireland U18 schools, helping them retain the Centenary Shield in 2006. He is an Ireland under-21 and under-23 international, having made his debut for the former against Sweden in 2007. On 10 August 2010, Coleman scored his first international goal in a 5–0 win against Estonia. In the same month he won the 2009 FAI Under 21 Player of the Year Award. He retained the award in 2010. He captained Ireland in a 1–0 defeat against Turkey in November 2010.

Senior

Coleman received his first call-up to the senior squad in October 2010, and made his full international debut in the Republic of Ireland's inaugural Nations Cup match against Wales on 8 February 2011, which Ireland won 3–0.

On 29 May 2013, Coleman was named Man of the Match for his performance against England at Wembley Stadium. He crossed the ball for Shane Long's opening goal of the game, a header past Joe Hart.
Coleman captained Ireland for the first time in a 2014 World Cup qualifier against Germany on 11 October 2013, his 25th birthday, which Ireland lost 3–0 in Cologne.

On 31 May 2016, Coleman was selected in Martin O'Neill's 23-man squad for Euro 2016. At the tournament, he captained Ireland in their final group game victory over Italy. The 1–0 win ensured that the team advanced past the group stages at a UEFA European Championship for the first time. He was also captain for Ireland's Round of 16 match against France in Lyon where the hosts prevailed 2–1 winners.

Coleman was named the permanent Ireland captain in September 2016 following the international retirement of Robbie Keane. The following month, he scored his first senior international goal for Ireland in a 1–0 win over Georgia at the Aviva Stadium in a 2018 World Cup qualifier.

On 24 March 2017, Coleman suffered a broken leg in the 69th minute of a goalless draw in a World Cup qualifier against Wales following a dangerous tackle by Neil Taylor for which the Welshman was given a straight red card. Coleman received treatment on the pitch and was given oxygen as he was comforted by teammate Shane Long before being carried off on a stretcher. He was brought directly to Dublin's St. Vincent's Hospital where he underwent surgery on a fractured tibia and fibula of his right leg. Ireland manager Martin O'Neill stated that Coleman's injury was a "huge blow" to both Ireland and Everton but backed the player to return to his "brilliant" best. Taylor's challenge was widely condemned across the football world with the Aston Villa defender himself said to be "devastated" about causing a serious injury. Wales manager Chris Coleman later revealed that Taylor went into the Ireland team's changing room to apologise for the incident. Many fellow footballers, sports personalities and celebrities took to Twitter to send messages of support to Coleman including Wayne Rooney, Shay Given, Héctor Bellerín, Paul McGrath, Tony Bellew and Niall Horan. On 26 March, O'Neill confirmed the surgery on the right-back's fractured leg had been a success.

Coleman's first call-up since the injury came for the squad to face Turkey on 23 March 2018.

Style of play

Coleman has been regarded as one of the Premier League's best full-backs. A quick, skilful and hard-working player with immense stamina, he is renowned for his eagerness to get forward on attacking runs which has established his goalscoring prowess. Coleman has shown a proficiency for having great composure when in possession of the ball and his former Everton teammate Ashley Williams has hailed him as one of the best players he has ever played with.

Despite being very quiet by nature, Coleman has shown great leadership qualities which has propelled him to the role of captain of the Irish national team. He led the Ireland team out for their final two matches at Euro 2016, earning much praise from teammates, fans and media alike. He has since taken on the role of Ireland captain on a permanent basis. In March 2018, it was suggested by ESPN FC journalist Luke O'Farrell that Coleman should also be the next club captain at Everton, highlighting that the full-back "leads by example and, more importantly, demands more from his teammates. Coleman has never been afraid to let another player know when something is not working or needs improvement. [...] Coleman sets the mark for the rest of the team to follow". O'Farrell's wish came to fruition in August 2019 when Coleman became the new Everton captain following the departure of Phil Jagielka.

Personal life
Coleman supports the Donegal county football team. He also still follows his local GAA team, Na Cealla Beaga, and attended the final of the 2013 Donegal Senior Football Championship when they lost to Gleann tSuilí.

In an Everton matchday programme ahead of a Premier League win over Wolverhampton Wanderers, Coleman mentioned Michael Murphy as his favourite sportsperson outside association football, both for his manner on the field of play and his personality off it.

In June 2015, he married his childhood sweetheart Rachel Cunningham in St. Mary of the Visitation Church in Killybegs. Their daughters were born in 2016 and 2018.
They also have a son, born in 2021.

Career statistics

Club

International

International goals
As of match played 24 September 2022. Ireland score listed first, score column indicates score after each Coleman goal.

Honours
Blackpool
Football League Championship play-offs: 2009–10

Republic of Ireland
Nations Cup: 2011

Individual
Donegal Sports Star Professional Sport Achievement Award: 2009
FAI Under-21 International Player of the Year: 2009, 2010
PFA Team of the Year: 2013–14 Premier League
Everton Player's Player of the Year: 2013–14
Everton Supporter's Player of the Year: 2013–14
BBC MOTD Goal of the month February 2023

References

External links

Profile at the Everton F.C. website
Profile at the Football Association of Ireland website

1988 births
Living people
Association football defenders
Association footballers from County Donegal
Expatriate footballers in England
Irish expatriate sportspeople in England
St Catherine's F.C. players
Sligo Rovers F.C. players
Everton F.C. players
Blackpool F.C. players
League of Ireland players
Premier League players
English Football League players
Republic of Ireland association footballers
Republic of Ireland under-21 international footballers
Republic of Ireland under-23 international footballers
Republic of Ireland international footballers
UEFA Euro 2016 players
Republic of Ireland expatriate association footballers
Republic of Ireland men's futsal players
Donegal Gaelic footballers
Gaelic football backs
Gaelic footballers who switched code
Killybegs Gaelic footballers